Lorenzo Senatore, ICG, AIC (born 2 March 1974 in London, England) is an Italian cinematographer. He studied filmmaking in Rome, and at the age of 25 became the youngest steadicam and camera operator in Italy. He has served as a camera operator and 2nd unit director of photography on numerous blockbuster films including 300: Rise of an Empire, Spectre, London Has Fallen, Beauty and the Beast, and Wonder Woman. He has also served as director of photography on a number of Syfy television films.

Filmography

Film

TV movies

Other credits

Additional photography

Steadicam operator

Second unit photography

Camera operator

References 

1974 births
Living people
Italian cinematographers
British emigrants to Italy